Orvil may refer to:

Orvil A. Anderson (1895-1965), pioneer balloonist and United States Air Force major general
Orvil Dryfoos (1912-1963), Wall Street businessman and publisher of The New York Times from 1961 to 1963
Ernst Orvil (1898–1985), Norwegian novelist, short story writer, lyricist and playwright
Orvil Township, Logan County, Illinois
Orvil Township, New Jersey

See also
Orville (disambiguation)